Zviadi Samukashvili (born 22 November 1987) is a Georgian male weightlifter, competing in the 56 kg category and representing Georgia at international competitions. He competed in world championships, most recently at the 2007 World Weightlifting Championships.

Major results

References

Further reading
 
 Olympic Weightlifting.eu
 IWRP.net
 OlyStats.com

1987 births
Living people
Male weightlifters from Georgia (country)
Place of birth missing (living people)